Richard M. Harland  is CH Li Distinguished Professor of Genetics, Genomics and Development at the University of California, Berkeley.

Education
Harland completed his PhD at the Medical Research Council (MRC) Laboratory of Molecular Biology (LMB) at the University of Cambridge under the supervision of Ron Laskey on regulation of DNA replication in Xenopus embryos.

Career and research
Following postdoctoral work at the LMB and at the Fred Hutchinson Cancer Research Center with Harold M. Weintraub and Steve McKnight in Seattle he moved to the University of California, Berkeley in 1985.

Harland's research aims to understand early developmental biology of vertebrates at the molecular level. Major contributions include understanding the early embryo, and the induction and patterning of the neural plate and the Spemann-Mangold organizer.

Awards and honours
Harland was elected a Fellow of the Royal Society (FRS) in 2019 for "substantial contributions to the improvement of natural knowledge". He was also elected a Member of the National Academy of Sciences of the United States in 2014.

References

Fellows of the Royal Society
Members of the United States National Academy of Sciences
Living people
University of California, Berkeley faculty
Alumni of the University of Cambridge
Year of birth missing (living people)
Fred Hutchinson Cancer Research Center people